Bidding for the 2014 Commonwealth Games began from 24 February 2006 until the winner was announced on 9 November 2007. Glasgow won the race and was selected by the General Assembly of the  Commonwealth Games Federation (CGF) at a meeting in Sri Lanka to host the games. The vote was 47 votes for Glasgow and 24 for Abuja. The decision was announced by Mike Fennell, the Chairman of the CGF.

Bidding process

Bidding timeline 
The bidding process has a series deadlines and milestones in the Candidature Procedure

The main dates were:
2006
24 February 2006 – This was the date when Commonwealth Games Associations / Candidate Cities had to notify the CGF that they intended to bid.
10 March 2006 – This was the date when Candidate Cities had to pay a non-refundable Candidature Fee of £60,000 to the CGF.
9 May 2007 – The bids were lodged with the CGF on this date, or sooner.  Candidate Cities were then allowed to produce an emblem with the Commonwealth Games symbol (The Bar) and also contain terminology which stipulates that the city is a "Candidate City" for the 2014 Commonwealth Games.
2007
June/July 2007 – The CGF Evaluation Committee formally reviewed confirmed bids.
9 September 2007 – The CGF Evaluation Committee Report was published in London
9 October 2007 – Deadline for any updates by the Candidate Cities in response to the Evaluation Committee Report.
9 November 2007 – The CGF General Assembly in Colombo awards the right to host the 2014 Commonwealth Games.

The Candidate City Manual was published in November 2005.  It comes in 4 parts, the first part outlines what is required of the Candidate City during the bid process, the second part provides the structure of the Candidature File to be submitted to the CGF, the third part gives precise instructions on the presentation of a Candidature City's presentation to the CGF.  The last part outlines the issues during and after the bid process.

Vote

The final decision on who was to host the 2014 Commonwealth Games was held in Colombo, Sri Lanka on 9 November 2007 at the CGF General Assembly.

Each bid city made a presentation to the General Assembly, the order of which was determined by drawing lots.

The CGF members voted in a secret ballot and as there was only 2 bids with winner was announced by the CGF President, Mike Fennell in the first round, with the winner only requiring a simple majority.

The results of the bidding process were

Cities that were considered

Candidate Cities 
Three cities submitted bids to host the 2014 Commonwealth Games that were recognised by the CGF. The three cities were; Glasgow (Scotland), Abuja (Nigeria) and Halifax (Canada).

Proposed bids which did not go to application 
The following cities proposed bidding; however, they did not bid or even formally announce their intentions to bid.

 Gold Coast, Australia
 Wellington, New Zealand
 Birmingham, England
 Cape Town, South Africa
 Cardiff, Wales
 Edinburgh, Scotland
 Glasgow, Scotland 
 Halifax, Canada
 Calgary, Alberta, Canada
 Hamilton, Ontario, Canada
 York Region, Canada
 Ottawa, Ontario, Canada
 Sheffield, England
 Singapore, Singapore
 Windhoek, Namibia

Evaluation of Candidate Cities

The Report of the CGF Evaluation Commission for the 2014 Commonwealth Games was published on 9 September 2007, John Tieney, the Chairman of the CGF Evaluation Commission said: "The commission believes that the report is a fair and accurate representation of each city's bid, its strengths and the major issues which may arise if the city is selected".  Both bids were highly recommended, though Glasgow's was technically superior according to the CGF Evaluation Report that was released in September 2007.

Notes

External links
Candidate City Manual – 2014 Commonwealth Games
The Report of the CGF Evaluation Commission for the 2014 Commonwealth Games

Commonwealth Games bids
2014 Commonwealth Games